Instructional design (ID), also known as instructional systems design (ISD), is the practice of systematically designing, developing and delivering instructional materials and experiences, both digital and physical, in a consistent and reliable fashion toward an efficient, effective, appealing, engaging and inspiring acquisition of knowledge. The process consists broadly of determining the state and needs of the learner, defining the end goal of instruction, and creating some "intervention" to assist in the transition. The outcome of this instruction may be directly observable and scientifically measured or completely hidden and assumed. There are many instructional design models but many are based on the ADDIE model with the five phases: analysis, design, development, implementation, and evaluation.

Robert M. Gagné is considered one of the founders of ISD due to the great influence his work, The Conditions of Learning, has had on the discipline.

History

Origins 
As a field, instructional design is historically and traditionally rooted in cognitive and behavioral psychology, though recently constructivism has influenced thinking in the field. This can be attributed to the way it emerged during a period when the behaviorist paradigm was dominating American psychology. There are also those who cite that, aside from behaviorist psychology, the origin of the concept could be traced back to systems engineering. While the impact of each of these fields is difficult to quantify, it is argued that the language and the "look and feel" of the early forms of instructional design and their progeny were derived from this engineering discipline. Specifically, they were linked to the training development model used by the U.S. military, which were based on systems approach and was explained as "the idea of viewing a problem or situation in its entirety with all its ramifications, with all its interior interactions, with all its exterior connections and with full cognizance of its place in its context."

The role of systems engineering in the early development of instructional design was demonstrated during World War II when a considerable amount of training materials for the military were developed based on the principles of instruction, learning, and human behavior. Tests for assessing a learner's abilities were used to screen candidates for the training programs. After the success of military training, psychologists began to view training as a system and developed various analysis, design, and evaluation procedures. In 1946, Edgar Dale outlined a hierarchy of instructional methods, organized intuitively by their concreteness. The framework first migrated to the industrial sector to train workers before it finally found its way to the education field.

1950s

B. F. Skinner's 1954 article "The Science of Learning and the Art of Teaching" suggested that effective instructional materials, called programmed instructional materials, should include small steps, frequent questions, and immediate feedback; and should allow self-pacing. Robert F. Mager popularized the use of learning objectives with his 1962 article "Preparing Objectives for Programmed Instruction". The article describes how to write objectives including desired behavior, learning condition, and assessment.

In 1956, a committee led by Benjamin Bloom published an influential taxonomy with three domains of learning: cognitive (what one knows or thinks), psychomotor (what one does, physically) and affective (what one feels, or what attitudes one has). These taxonomies still influence the design of instruction.

1960s
Robert Glaser introduced "criterion-referenced measures" in 1962. In contrast to norm-referenced tests in which an individual's performance is compared to group performance, a criterion-referenced test is designed to test an individual's behavior in relation to an objective standard. It can be used to assess the learners' entry level behavior, and to what extent learners have developed mastery through an instructional program.

In 1965, Robert Gagné (see below for more information) described three domains of learning outcomes (cognitive, affective, psychomotor), five learning outcomes (Verbal Information, Intellectual Skills, Cognitive Strategy, Attitude, Motor Skills), and nine events of instruction in "The Conditions of Learning", which remain foundations of instructional design practices. Gagne's work in learning hierarchies and hierarchical analysis led to an important notion in instruction – to ensure that learners acquire prerequisite skills before attempting superordinate ones.

In 1967, after analyzing the failure of training material, Michael Scriven suggested the need for formative assessment – e.g., to try out instructional materials with learners (and revise accordingly) before declaring them finalized.

1970s
During the 1970s, the number of instructional design models greatly increased and prospered in different sectors in military, academia, and industry. Many instructional design theorists began to adopt an information-processing-based approach to the design of instruction. David Merrill for instance developed Component Display Theory (CDT), which concentrates on the means of presenting instructional materials (presentation techniques).

1980s
Although interest in instructional design continued to be strong in business and the military, there was little evolution of ID in schools or higher education.
However, educators and researchers began to consider how the personal computer could be used in a learning environment or a learning space. PLATO (Programmed Logic for Automatic Teaching Operation) is one example of how computers began to be integrated into instruction. Many of the first uses of computers in the classroom were for "drill and skill" exercises. There was a growing interest in how cognitive psychology could be applied to instructional design.

1990s
The influence of constructivist theory on instructional design became more prominent in the 1990s as a counterpoint to the more traditional cognitive learning theory. Constructivists believe that learning experiences should be "authentic" and produce real-world learning environments that allow learners to construct their own knowledge. This emphasis on the learner was a significant departure away from traditional forms of instructional design.

Performance improvement was also seen as an important outcome of learning that needed to be considered during the design process. The World Wide Web emerged as an online learning tool with hypertext and hypermedia being recognized as good tools for learning. As technology advanced and constructivist theory gained popularity, technology's use in the classroom began to evolve from mostly drill and skill exercises to more interactive activities that required more complex thinking on the part of the learner. Rapid prototyping was first seen during the 1990s. In this process, an instructional design project is prototyped quickly and then vetted through a series of try and revise cycles. This is a big departure from traditional methods of instructional design that took far longer to complete.

2000 - 2010
Online learning became common. Technology advances permitted sophisticated simulations with authentic and realistic learning experiences.

In 2008, the Association for Educational Communications and Technology (AECT) changed the definition of Educational Technology to "the study and ethical practice of facilitating learning and improving performance by creating, using, and managing appropriate technological processes and resources".

2010 - 2020
Academic degrees focused on integrating technology, internet, and human–computer interaction with education gained momentum with the introduction of Learning Design and Technology (LDT) majors.  Universities such as Bowling Green State University, Penn State, Purdue, San Diego State University, Stanford, Harvard University of Georgia, California State University, Fullerton, and Carnegie Mellon University have established undergraduate and graduate degrees in technology-centered methods of designing and delivering education.

Informal learning became an area of growing importance in instructional design, particularly in the workplace. A 2014 study showed that formal training makes up only 4 percent of the 505 hours per year an average employee spends learning. It also found that the learning output of informal learning is equal to that of formal training. As a result of this and other research, more emphasis was placed on creating knowledge bases and other supports for self-directed learning.

Instructional Design history

Robert Gagné

Robert Gagné's work is widely used and cited in the design of instruction, as exemplified by more than 130 citations in prominent journals in the field during the period from 1985 through 1990. Synthesizing ideas from behaviorism and cognitivism, he provided a clear template, which is easy to follow for designing instructional events. Instructional designers who follow Gagné's theory will likely have tightly focused, efficient instruction.

Taxonomy 
Robert Gagné classified the types of learning outcomes by asking how learning might be demonstrated. His domains and outcomes of learning correspond to standard verbs.
 Cognitive Domain
Verbal information - is stated: state, recite, tell, declare
Intellectual skills - label or classify the concepts
Intellectual skills - apply the rules and principles
Intellectual skills - problem solve by generating solutions or procedures
Discrimination: discriminate, distinguish, differentiate
Concrete Concept: identify, name, specify, label
Defined Concept: classify, categorize, type, sort (by definition)
Rule: demonstrate, show, solve (using one rule)
Higher order rule: generate, develop, solve (using two or more rules)
Cognitive strategies - are used for learning: adopt, create, originate
 Affective Domain
Attitudes - are demonstrated by preferring options: choose, prefer, elect, favor
 Psychomotor Domain
Motor skills - enable physical performance: execute, perform, carry out

Nine events 
According to Gagné, learning occurs in a series of nine learning events, each of which is a condition for learning which must be accomplished before moving to the next in order. Similarly, instructional events should mirror the learning events:

 Gaining attention: To ensure reception of coming instruction, the teacher gives the learners a stimulus. Before the learners can start to process any new information, the instructor must gain the attention of the learners. This might entail using abrupt changes in the instruction.
 Informing learners of objectives: The teacher tells the learner what they will be able to do because of the instruction. The teacher communicates the desired outcome to the group.
 Stimulating recall of prior learning: The teacher asks for recall of existing relevant knowledge.
 Presenting the stimulus: The teacher gives emphasis to distinctive features.
 Providing learning guidance: The teacher helps the students in understanding (semantic encoding) by providing organization and relevance.
 Eliciting performance: The teacher asks the learners to respond, demonstrating learning.
 Providing feedback: The teacher gives informative feedback on the learners' performance.
 Assessing performance: The teacher requires more learner performance, and gives feedback, to reinforce learning.
 Enhancing retention and transfer: The teacher provides varied practice to generalize the capability.

Some educators believe that Gagné's taxonomy of learning outcomes and events of instruction oversimplify the learning process by over-prescribing. However, using them as part of a complete instructional package can assist many educators in becoming more organized and staying focused on the instructional goals.

Influence 
Robert Gagné's work has been the foundation of instructional design since the beginning of the 1960s when he conducted research and developed training materials for the military.   Among the first to coin the term "instructional design", Gagné developed some of the earliest instructional design models and ideas.  These models have laid the groundwork for more present-day instructional design models from theorists like Dick, Carey, and Carey (The Dick and Carey Systems Approach Model), Jerold Kemp's Instructional Design Model, and David Merrill (Merrill's First Principle of Instruction).  Each of these models are based on a core set of learning phases that include (1) activation of prior experience, (2) demonstration of skills, (3) application of skills, and (4) integration or these skills into real world activities.

Gagné's main focus for instructional design was how instruction and learning could be systematically connected to the design of instruction.  He emphasized the design principles and procedures that need to take place for effective teaching and learning.  His initial ideas, along with the ideas of other early instructional designers were outlined in Psychological Principles in Systematic Development, written by Roberts B. Miller and edited by Gagné.  Gagné believed in internal learning and motivation which paved the way for theorists like Merrill, Li, and Jones who designed the Instructional Transaction Theory, Reigeluth and Stein's Elaboration Theory, and most notably, Keller's ARCS Model of Motivation and Design.

Prior to Robert Gagné, learning was often thought of as a single, uniform process.  There was little or no distinction made between "learning to load a rifle and learning to solve a complex mathematical problem".   Gagné  offered an alternative view which developed the idea that different learners required different learning strategies.  Understanding and designing instruction based on a learning style defined by the individual brought about new theories and approaches to teaching.
Gagné 's understanding and theories of human learning added significantly to understanding the stages in cognitive processing and instructions.  For example, Gagné  argued that instructional designers must understand the characteristics and functions of short-term and long-term memory to facilitate meaningful learning. This idea encouraged instructional designers to include cognitive needs as a top-down instructional approach.

Gagné (1966) defines curriculum as a sequence of content units arranged in such a way that the learning of each unit may be accomplished as a single act, provided the capabilities described by specified prior units (in the sequence) have already been mastered by the learner.

His definition of curriculum has been the basis of many important initiatives in schools and other educational environments.  In the late 1950s and early 1960s, Gagné  had expressed and established an interest in applying theory to practice with particular interest in applications for teaching, training and learning.  Increasing the effectiveness and efficiency of practice was of particular concern.  His ongoing attention to practice while developing theory continues to influence education and training.

Gagné's work has had a significant influence on American education, and military and industrial training. Gagné was one of the early developers of the concept of instructional systems design which suggests the components of a lesson can be analyzed and should be designed to operate together as an integrated plan for instruction. In "Educational Technology and the Learning Process" (Educational Researcher, 1974), Gagné defined instruction as "the set of planned external events which influence the process of learning and thus promote learning".

Learning design
The concept of learning design arrived in the literature of technology for education in the late 1990s and early 2000s with the idea that "designers and instructors need to choose for themselves the best mixture of behaviourist and constructivist learning experiences for their online courses".  But the concept of learning design is probably as old as the concept of teaching. Learning design might be defined as "the description of the teaching-learning process that takes place in a unit of learning (e.g., a course, a lesson or any other designed learning event)".

As summarized  by Britain, learning design may be associated with:
 The concept of learning design
 The implementation of the concept made by learning design specifications like PALO, IMS Learning Design, LDL, SLD 2.0, etc.
 The technical realisations around the implementation of the concept like TELOS, RELOAD LD-Author, etc.

Models

ADDIE process
Perhaps the most common model used for creating instructional materials is the ADDIE Model. This acronym stands for the 5 phases contained in the model (Analyze, Design, Develop, Implement, and Evaluate).

Brief History of ADDIE's Development – The ADDIE model was initially developed by Florida State University to explain "the processes involved in the formulation of an instructional systems development (ISD) program for military interservice training that will adequately train individuals to do a particular job and which can also be applied to any interservice curriculum development activity."  The model originally contained several steps under its five original phases (Analyze, Design, Develop, Implement, and [Evaluation and] Control), whose completion was expected before movement to the next phase could occur.  Over the years, the steps were revised and eventually the model itself became more dynamic and interactive than its original hierarchical rendition, until its most popular version appeared in the mid-80s, as we understand it today.

The five phases are listed and explained below:

Analyze – The first phase of content development is Analysis. Analysis refers to the gathering of information about one's audience, the tasks to be completed, how the learners will view the content, and the project's overall goals.  The instructional designer then classifies the information to make the content more applicable and successful.

Design – The second phase is the Design phase. In this phase, instructional designers begin to create their project. Information gathered from the analysis phase, in conjunction with the theories and models of instructional design, is meant to explain how the learning will be acquired. For example, the design phase begins with writing a learning objective. Tasks are then identified and broken down to be more manageable for the designer. The final step determines the kind of activities required for the audience in order to meet the goals identified in the Analyze phase.

Develop – The third phase, Development, involves the creation of the activities that will be implemented. It is in this stage that the blueprints of the design phase are assembled.

Implement – After the content is developed, it is then Implemented. This stage allows the instructional designer to test all materials to determine if they are functional and appropriate for the intended audience.

Evaluate – The final phase, Evaluate, ensures the materials achieved the desired goals. The evaluation phase consists of two parts: formative and summative assessment. The ADDIE model is an iterative process of instructional design, which means that at each stage the designer can assess the project's elements and revise them if necessary.  This process incorporates formative assessment, while the summative assessments contain tests or evaluations created for the content being implemented. This final phase is vital for the instructional design team because it provides data used to alter and enhance the design.

Connecting all phases of the model are external and reciprocal revision opportunities.  As in the internal Evaluation phase, revisions should and can be made throughout the entire process.

Most of the current instructional design models are variations of the ADDIE model.

Rapid prototyping
An adaptation of the ADDIE model, which is used sometimes, is a practice known as rapid prototyping.

Proponents suggest that through an iterative process the verification of the design documents saves time and money by catching problems while they are still easy to fix. This approach is not novel to the design of instruction, but appears in many design-related domains including software design, architecture, transportation planning, product development, message design, user experience design, etc. In fact, some proponents of design prototyping assert that a sophisticated understanding of a problem is incomplete without creating and evaluating some type of prototype, regardless of the analysis rigor that may have been applied up front. In other words, up-front analysis is rarely sufficient to allow one to confidently select an instructional model. For this reason many traditional methods of instructional design are beginning to be seen as incomplete, naive, and even counter-productive.

However, some consider rapid prototyping to be a somewhat simplistic type of model. As this argument goes, at the heart of Instructional Design is the analysis phase. After you thoroughly conduct the analysis—you can then choose a model based on your findings. That is the area where most people get snagged—they simply do not do a thorough-enough analysis. (Part of Article By Chris Bressi on LinkedIn)

Dick and Carey
Another well-known instructional design model is the Dick and Carey Systems Approach Model. The model was originally published in 1978 by Walter Dick and Lou Carey in their book entitled The Systematic Design of Instruction.

Dick and Carey made a significant contribution to the instructional design field by championing a systems view of instruction, in contrast to defining instruction as the sum of isolated parts. The model addresses instruction as an entire system, focusing on the interrelationship between context, content, learning and instruction. According to Dick and Carey, "Components such as the instructor, learners, materials, instructional activities, delivery system, and learning and performance environments interact with each other and work together to bring about the desired student learning outcomes". The components of the Systems Approach Model, also known as the Dick and Carey Model, are as follows:
 Identify Instructional Goal(s): A goal statement describes a skill, knowledge or attitude (SKA) that a learner will be expected to acquire
 Conduct Instructional Analysis: Identify what a learner must recall and identify what learner must be able to do to perform particular task
 Analyze Learners and Contexts: Identify general characteristics of the target audience, including prior skills, prior experience, and basic demographics; identify characteristics directly related to the skill to be taught; and perform analysis of the performance and learning settings.
 Write Performance Objectives: Objectives consists of a description of the behavior, the condition and criteria. The component of an objective that describes the criteria will be used to judge the learner's performance.
 Develop Assessment Instruments: Purpose of entry behavior testing, purpose of pretesting, purpose of post-testing, purpose of practice items/practice problems
 Develop Instructional Strategy: Pre-instructional activities, content presentation, Learner participation, assessment
 Develop and Select Instructional Materials
 Design and Conduct Formative Evaluation of Instruction: Designers try to identify areas of the instructional materials that need improvement.
 Revise Instruction: To identify poor test items and to identify poor instruction
 Design and Conduct Summative Evaluation

With this model, components are executed iteratively and in parallel, rather than linearly.

Guaranteed Learning
The instructional design model, Guaranteed Learning, was formerly known as the Instructional Development Learning System (IDLS). The model was originally published in 1970 by Peter J. Esseff, PhD and Mary Sullivan Esseff, PhD in their book entitled IDLS—Pro Trainer 1: How to Design, Develop, and Validate Instructional Materials.

Peter (1968) & Mary (1972) Esseff both received their doctorates in Educational Technology from the Catholic University of America under the mentorship of Dr. Gabriel Ofiesh, a founding father of the Military Model mentioned above. Esseff and Esseff synthesized existing theories to develop their approach to systematic design, "Guaranteed Learning" aka "Instructional Development Learning System" (IDLS). In 2015, the Drs. Esseffs created an eLearning course to enable participants to take the GL course online under the direction of Dr. Esseff.

The components of the Guaranteed Learning Model are the following:
 Design a task analysis
 Develop criterion tests and performance measures
 Develop interactive instructional materials
 Validate the interactive instructional materials
 Create simulations or performance activities (Case Studies, Role Plays, and Demonstrations)

Other
Other useful instructional design models include: the Smith/Ragan Model, the Morrison/Ross/Kemp Model and the OAR Model of instructional design in higher education, as well as, Wiggins' theory of backward design.

Learning theories also play an important role in the design of instructional materials. Theories such as behaviorism, constructivism, social learning, and cognitivism help shape and define the outcome of instructional materials.

Also see: Managing Learning in High Performance Organizations, by Ruth Stiehl and Barbara Bessey, from The Learning Organization, Corvallis, Oregon.  .

Motivational design
Motivation is defined as an internal drive that activates behavior and gives it direction.  The term motivation theory is concerned with the process that describes why and how human behavior is activated and directed.

Motivation concepts
Intrinsic and Extrinsic Motivation
 Instrinsic: defined as the doing of an activity for its inherent satisfactions rather than for some separable consequence.  When intrinsically motivated a person is moved to act for the fun or challenge entailed rather than because of external rewards. Intrinsic motivation reflects the desire to do something because it is enjoyable.  If we are intrinsically motivated, we would not be worried about external rewards such as praise.
Examples: Writing short stories because you enjoy writing them, reading a book because you are curious about the topic, and playing chess because you enjoy effortful thinking
 Extrinsic: reflects the desire to do something because of external rewards such as awards, money and praise.  People who are extrinsically motivated may not enjoy certain activities.  They may only wish to engage in certain activities because they wish to receive some external reward.
Examples: The writer who only writes poems to be submitted to poetry contests, a person who dislikes sales but accepts a sales position because he/she desires to earn an above average salary, and a person selecting a major in college based on salary and prestige, rather than personal interest.

John Keller 
has devoted his career to researching and understanding motivation in instructional systems.  These decades of work constitute a major contribution to the instructional design field. First, by applying motivation theories systematically to design theory.  Second, in developing a unique problem-solving process he calls the ARCS Motivation....

ARCS MODEL 
The ARCS Model of Motivational Design was created by John Keller while he was researching ways to supplement the learning process with motivation.  The model is based on Tolman's and Lewin's expectancy-value theory, which presumes that people are motivated to learn if there is value in the knowledge presented (i.e. it fulfills personal needs) and if there is an optimistic expectation for success.  The model consists of four main areas: Attention, Relevance, Confidence, and Satisfaction.

Attention and relevance according to John Keller's ARCS motivational theory are essential to learning.  The first 2 of 4 key components for motivating learners, attention, and relevance can be considered the backbone of the ARCS theory, the latter components relying upon the former.

Components

Attention

The attention mentioned in this theory refers to the interest displayed by learners in taking in the concepts/ideas being taught.  This component is split into three categories: perceptual arousal, using surprise or uncertain situations; inquiry arousal, offering challenging questions and/or problems to answer/solve; and variability, using a variety of resources and methods of teaching.  Within each of these categories, John Keller has provided further sub-divisions of types of stimuli to grab attention. Grabbing attention is the most important part of the model because it initiates the motivation for the learners.  Once learners are interested in a topic, they are willing to invest their time, pay attention, and find out more.

Relevance

Relevance, according to Keller, must be established by using language and examples that the learners are familiar with.  The three major strategies Keller presents are goal-oriented, motive matching, and familiarity.  Like the Attention category, Keller divided the three major strategies into subcategories, which provide examples of how to make a lesson plan relevant to the learner. Learners will throw concepts to the wayside if their attention cannot be grabbed and sustained and if relevance is not conveyed.

Confidence

The confidence aspect of the ARCS model focuses on establishing positive expectations for achieving success among learners. The confidence level of learners is often correlated with motivation and the amount of effort put forth in reaching a performance objective. For this reason, it's important that learning design provides students with a method for estimating their probability of success. This can be achieved in the form of a syllabus and grading policy, rubrics, or a time estimate to complete tasks. Additionally, confidence is built when positive reinforcement for personal achievements is given through timely, relevant feedback.

Satisfaction

Finally, learners must obtain some type of satisfaction or reward from a learning experience. This satisfaction can be from a sense of achievement, praise from a higher-up, or mere entertainment. Feedback and reinforcement are important elements and when learners appreciate the results, they will be motivated to learn. Satisfaction is based upon motivation, which can be intrinsic or extrinsic. To keep learners satisfied, instruction should be designed to allow them to use their newly learned skills as soon as possible in as authentic a setting as possible.

Motivational Design Process 
Along with the motivational components (Attention, Relevance, Confidence, and Satisfaction) the ARCS model provides a process that can address motivational problems. This process has 4 phases (Analysis, Design, Development, and Evaluation) with 10 steps within the phases:

Step 1: Obtain course information

Includes reviewing the description of the course, the instructor, and way of delivery the information.

Step 2: Obtain audience information

Includes collecting the current skill level, attitudes towards the course, attitudes towards the teacher, attitudes towards the school.

Step 3: Analyze audience

This should help identify the motivational problem that needs to be addressed.

Step 4: Analyze existing materials

Identifying positives of the current instructional material, as well as any problems.

Step 5:  List objectives and assessments

This allows the creation of assessment tools that align with the objectives.

Step 6: List potential tactics

Brainstorming possible tactics that could fill in the motivational gaps.

Step 7: Select and design tactics

Integrates, enhances, and sustains tactics from the list that fit the situation.

Step 8: Integrate with instruction

Integrate the tactic that was chosen from the list into the instruction.

Step 9: Select and develop materials

Select materials, modify to fit the situation and develop new materials.

Step 10: Evaluate and revise

Obtain reactions from the learner and determine satisfaction level.

Motivating opportunities
Although Keller's ARCS model currently dominates instructional design with respect to learner motivation, in 2006 Hardré and Miller proposed a need for a new design model that includes current research in human motivation, a comprehensive treatment of motivation, integrates various fields of psychology and provides designers the flexibility to be applied to a myriad of situations.

Hardré  proposes an alternate model for designers called the Motivating Opportunities Model or MOM. Hardré's model incorporates cognitive, needs, and affective theories as well as social elements of learning to address learner motivation. MOM has seven key components spelling the acronym 'SUCCESS' – Situational, Utilization, Competence, Content, Emotional, Social, and Systemic.

Influential researchers and theorists

Alphabetic by last name

 Bloom, Benjamin – Taxonomies of the cognitive, affective, and psychomotor domains – 1950s
 Bransford, John D. – How People Learn: Bridging Research and Practice – 1990s
 Bruner, Jerome – Constructivism - 1950s-1990s
 Gagné, Robert M. – Nine Events of Instruction (Gagné and Merrill Video Seminar)
 Gibbons, Andrew S - developed the Theory of Model Centered Instruction; a theory rooted in Cognitive Psychology.
 Heinich, Robert – Instructional Media and the new technologies of instruction 3rd ed. – Educational Technology – 1989
 Jonassen, David – problem-solving strategies – 1990s
 Kemp, Jerold E. – Created a cognitive learning design model - 1980s
 Mager, Robert F. – ABCD model for instructional objectives – 1962 - Criterion-Referenced Instruction and Learning Objectives
 Marzano, Robert J. - "Dimensions of Learning", Formative Assessment - 2000s
 Mayer, Richard E. - Multimedia Learning - 2000s
 Merrill, M. David – Component Display Theory / Knowledge Objects / First Principles of Instruction
 Osguthorpe, Russell T. – Overview of Instructional Design – The education of the heart: rediscovering the spiritual roots of learning
 Papert, Seymour – Constructionism, LOGO – 1970s-1980s
 Piaget, Jean – Cognitive development – 1960s
 Reigeluth, Charles – Elaboration Theory, "Green Books" I, II, and III – 1990s–2010s
 Rita Richey - instructional design theory and research methods
 Schank, Roger – Constructivist simulations – 1990s
 Simonson, Michael – Instructional Systems and Design via Distance Education – 1980s
 Skinner, B.F. – Radical Behaviorism, Programed Instruction - 1950s-1970s
 Vygotsky, Lev – Learning as a social activity – 1930s
 Wiley, David A. - influential work on open content, open educational resources, and informal online learning communities

See also

References

External links

 Instructional Design – An overview of Instructional Design
 ISD Handbook
 Edutech wiki: Instructional design model
 ATD: What Is Instructional Design?

Applied psychology
Educational technology
Learning
Pedagogy
Communication design
Curricula